The 2016–17 Magyar Kupa, known as  for sponsorship reasons, was the 59th edition of the tournament.

Schedule
The rounds of the 2016–17 competition are scheduled as follows:

Matches 
A total of 46 matches will take place, starting with Round I on 2 September 2016 and culminating with the Final on 15 April 2017 at the Főnix Hall in Debrecen.

Round I
The first round ties are scheduled for 2 – 21 September 2016.

|-
!colspan="4" style="background:#ccccff;"| 2 September

|-
!colspan="3" style="background:#ccccff;"| 6 September

|-
!colspan="3" style="background:#ccccff;"| 14 September

|-
!colspan="3" style="background:#ccccff;"| 15 September

|-
!colspan="3" style="background:#ccccff;"| 20 September

|-
!colspan="3" style="background:#ccccff;"| 21 September

|}

Round II
The first round ties are scheduled for 3 – 11 October 2016.

|-
!colspan="4" style="background:#ccccff;"| 3 October

|-
!colspan="3" style="background:#ccccff;"| 4 October

|-
!colspan="3" style="background:#ccccff;"| 5 October

|-
!colspan="3" style="background:#ccccff;"| 11 October

|}

Round III
The first round ties are scheduled for 25 – 26 October 2016.

|-
!colspan="4" style="background:#ccccff;"| 25 October

|-
!colspan="3" style="background:#ccccff;"| 26 October

|}

Round IV
The first round ties are scheduled for 2 – 7 February 2017.

|-
!colspan="3" style="background:#ccccff;"| 2 February

|-
!colspan="3" style="background:#ccccff;"| 4 February

|-
!colspan="3" style="background:#ccccff;"| 7 February

|}

Round V
The quarterfinals (Round V) ties are scheduled for 16 March 2017.

|-
!colspan="3" style="background:#ccccff;"| 16 March

|}

Final four
The final four will be held on 14–15 April 2017 at the Főnix Hall in Debrecen.

Awards
Most valuable player:  Gašper Marguč (Telekom Veszprém)
Best Goalkeeper:  José Manuel Sierra (MOL-Pick Szeged)

Semi-finals

Bronze medal match

Final

Final standings

See also
 2016–17 Nemzeti Bajnokság I
 2016–17 Nemzeti Bajnokság I/B
 2016–17 Nemzeti Bajnokság II

References

External links
 Hungarian Handball Federaration 
 hetmeteres.hu

Magyar Kupa Men